Donald Robert Marshall (born March 23, 1932) is a Canadian former ice hockey forward.

Don played in the National Hockey League from 1951 to 1972. During this time, he played for the New York Rangers, Buffalo Sabres, Toronto Maple Leafs and Montreal Canadiens.  While Don was with Montreal, the Canadiens won an NHL record five consecutive Stanley Cups 1956-57-58-59-60. Don mostly played on the team's checking line with Phil Goyette and Claude Provost.

Marshall played 1176 career NHL games, scoring 265 goals and 324 assists for 589 points.

Marshall shares the NHL record for the quickest goal to start a period (with Denis Savard and James van Riemsdyk) when he scored 4 seconds into the second period against the Boston Bruins on November 9, 1957.

Legacy
 Ranked No. 75 all-time of the 901 New York Rangers who had played during the team's first 82 seasons, in the 2009 book 100 Ranger Greats

Career statistics

Regular season and playoffs

Awards and Accomplishments 
NHL Second All-Star team, 1967
Played in NHL All Star Game (1956-60, 1961, 1968)

See also
List of NHL players with 1000 games played

References

External links

1932 births
Living people
Anglophone Quebec people
Buffalo Sabres players
Canadian expatriate ice hockey players in the United States
Canadian ice hockey forwards
Cincinnati Mohawks (IHL) players
Ice hockey people from Montreal
Montreal Canadiens players
Montreal Junior Canadiens players
New York Rangers players
People from Verdun, Quebec
Stanley Cup champions
Toronto Maple Leafs players